Paul-Henri Mathieu defeated Andreas Seppi 6–7(1–7), 6–4, 7–5 to win the 2007 Allianz Suisse Open Gstaad singles event.

Seeds

Draws

Key
Q - Qualifier
WC - Wild Card

Finals

Section 1

Section 2

External links
Singles draw
Qualifying draw

Singles